Jacques Pellegrin (born 17 June 1944- 7 Απριλίου 2021) is a French painter.

Biography
Jacques Pellegrin paints portraits, landscapes and still lifes. He started to paint at age eight. When he was eleven years old, he carried off the first prize from the Aix-en-Provence city hall.
His style connected first to classic and realist art movements, but then he discovered Impressionism.  After studying to be a translator in Munich, he obtained a German (language) licence in Aix-en-Provence. Teaching was quickly forsaken in favour of living a life of chance as a free artist. In 1980 he devoted himself to painting and studied German Expressionism. Pellegrin was influenced by Fauvists and French Expressionists such as Vincent van Gogh, André Derain, Albert Marquet, Kees van Dongen, and Henri Matisse.  He also followed artists of the Provence and Marseille schools, including Auguste Chabaud, Louis Mathieu Verdilhan, and Pierre Ambrogiani.
His fundamental guideline: to paint and depict his epoch, his time.

He frequently uses strong colors and underlines his figures with a thick, black stroke. Each painting tells a story, an anecdote, a memory. At the same time, strongly anchored in his epoch, when Pellegrin raises up the past, he does not emphasize nostalgia, only affection.

He is mentioned in the Benezit Dictionary of Artists (1999 and 2006).

Main exhibitions

Exhibitions
 1967 : Aix-en-Provence, Galerie La Provence Libérée
 1969 : Aix-en-Provence, Galerie La Provence Libérée
 1972 : Aix-en-Provence, Galerie des Cardeurs
 1977 : Marseille, Galerie Le Tigre de Papier
 1978 : Aix-en-Provence, Galerie Les Amis des Arts
 1980 : Marseille, Galerie Mary
 1983 : Aix-en-Provence, Galerie du Belvédère
 1984 : Toulon, Galerie du Var-Matin
 1986 : Marseille, Galerie La Poutre
 1989 : Marseille, Galerie Chaix Bryan
 1990 : Marseille, Galerie Forum Ars-Galicana
 1991 : Marseille, Galerie Sylvestre
 1993 : Ajaccio, Galerie La Marge
 1993 : Lyon, Galerie Auguste Comte
 1994 : Marseille, Galerie Montgrand
 1995 : Ajaccio, Galerie La Marge
 1995 - 1998 : Lyon, Galerie des Brotteaux
 1997 : Aubenas, Château d'Aubenas
 1998 : Saint-Rémy-de-Provence, Galerie à l'Espace des Arts
 2000 : Châteauneuf-le-Rouge, Musée Arteum
 2001 : London, Summer's Arts Gallery
 2001 : Tübingen, Casula Gallery
 2005 - 2006 : Aix-en-Provence, Casula Gallery
 2006 : Brussels, Lyon, Saint-Rémy-de-Provence, Galerie à l'Espace des Arts
 2006 : Milan, Casula Gallery
 2008 : Dubai, Art Phui
 2009 : Marseille, Galerie Art 152
 2009 : Brussels, Galerie à l'Espace des Arts
 2009 - 2010 : Dubai, The Mojo Gallery
 2010 : Casablanca, Galerie au 9
 2010 : Saint-Rémy-de-Provence, Musée Jouenne
 2011 : Marrakech, Marrakech Art Fair
 2012 : Saint-Cyr-sur-Mer, Grand Hôtel Les Lecques
 2012 : Stockholm, La Petite Galerie Française
 2012 : Guangzhou, Canton Art Fair
 2012 : Paris, Salon d'Automne at Grand Palais
 2012 : Shanghai, Shanghai Art Fair
 2013 : Hong Kong, Asia Contemporary Art Show at Marriott hotel
 2014 : Singapore, Ode to Art Gallery
 2014 : Bouc-Bel-Air, Castle
 2014 : Aix-en-Provence, City Hall
 2015 : Ajaccio, Galerie l'Académie
 2016 : Marseille, La Bastide Massimo
 2017 : Aix-en-Provence, Jacquou le Croquant
 2017 : Marseille, La Bastide Massimo
 2017 : Miami (United States), Spectrum Art Fair

Public collections
 Since 2000 : Châteauneuf-le-Rouge, Modern Art Museum

External links
 Provençal masters
 Galerie Art 152
 Galerie Emmanuel Rogé
 Galerie Espace des Arts
 Art actif

Notes

1944 births
Living people
artists from Aix-en-Provence
20th-century French painters
20th-century French male artists
French male painters
21st-century French painters
21st-century French male artists